Fa'atiga Lemalu (born 17 April 1989) is a New Zealand-born, Samoan international rugby union footballer who plays as a lock.

Lemalu played his professional rugby for the Munakata Sanix Blues in Fukuoka, Japan after joining them in 2013. He was also named in the new Japanese  squad which who made their first appearance Super Rugby for the 2016 season.

In 2017, Lemalu joined UK powerhouse club Saracens towards the later stage of the season as an injury cover during their 2016-17 Premiership Rugby campaign.

Lemalu would go on to play for Auckland Rugby, later becoming the champions of the 2018 Mitre 10 Cup in New Zealand since 2007.

Lemalu is a full international for  having made his debut in a match against  in 2012, missing the 2015 Rugby World Cup due to injury.

Yorkshire Carnegie strengthened their squad in November 2018 with the capture of Samoan international second row for the remainder of the 2018-2019 Greene King IPA Championship season.

At the beginning of the 2019 IPA Green King Championship, Cornish Pirates secured Lemalu on a two year deal which saw him make 19 appearances before heading back to New Zealand signing with Manawatu Turbos for the upcoming Bunnings NPC 2021 season.

References

1989 births
Living people
New Zealand rugby union players
Samoa international rugby union players
Samoan expatriate rugby union players
Samoan expatriate sportspeople in Japan
Expatriate rugby union players in Japan
Rugby union locks
Munakata Sanix Blues players
Sunwolves players
Auckland rugby union players
Rugby union players from Auckland
New Zealand sportspeople of Samoan descent
Samoan rugby union players
Rugby union flankers
Rugby union number eights
Saracens F.C. players
Leeds Tykes players
Cornish Pirates players
Manawatu rugby union players